Life is a 1999 American buddy comedy-drama film directed by Ted Demme. The film stars Eddie Murphy and Martin Lawrence. It is the second film featuring Murphy and Lawrence together, the first being Boomerang. The supporting cast includes Ned Beatty, R. Lee Ermey, Obba Babatundé, Bernie Mac, Anthony Anderson, Miguel A. Núñez Jr., Bokeem Woodbine, Guy Torry, Michael Taliferro and Barry Shabaka Henley. The film's format is a story being told by an elderly inmate about two of his friends, Ray (Murphy) and Claude (Lawrence), who are both wrongfully convicted of murder and sentenced to life in prison. It received an Oscar nomination for Best Makeup at the 72nd Academy Awards. Life failed to meet the studio's expectations at the box office, and received mixed reactions from critics. The film later found a strong cult following among Murphy and Lawrence’s fans, establishing Life as a cult classic.

Plot
In 1997, at the Mississippi State Penitentiary, elderly convict Willie Long tells his friends' life story at their burial. Ray Gibson and Claude Banks, New Yorkers from different worlds, meet at a club called Spanky's in 1932. Ray, a small-time thief, picks Claude as a mark. Ray convinces club-owner Spanky to let him and Claude pay off their debt via boot-legging. Traveling south to buy Mississippi "hooch", they pay for the booze and enter a local bar. Ray loses his father's prized pocketwatch to card hustler Winston Hancock. Outside, racist sheriff Warren Pike kills Hancock, framing Ray and Claude.

Ray and Claude are given life sentences, with hard labor at an infamous prison camp called Camp 8. They immediately run afoul of the guards, Sergeant Dillard and Hoppin' Bob, and also meet fellow inmates Jangle Leg (who makes a pass at Claude), Willie Long, Biscuit (another homosexual inmate, involved with Jangle Leg), Radio, Goldmouth (a bully who picks a fight with Ray), Cookie the chef, and Pokerface. Claude's cousin, an attorney, unsuccessfully appeals his conviction and seduces his girlfriend (who’s grown tired of Claude’s selfishness). With no chance at freedom, Claude and Ray break out, getting as far as Tallahatchie before being captured.

In 1944, twelve years later, Claude and Ray meet young, mute inmate "Can't-Get-Right", a talented baseball player who is sighted by a Negro league scout who offers a pardon to play. Sensing opportunity, Ray and Claude introduce themselves as his handlers. Despite his talent, Can't-Get-Right is often distracted by Mae Rose, the daughter of Camp 8's superintendent Abernathy. After Mae Rose gives birth to a biracial boy, Abernathy demands to know who is the father. Various inmates simultaneously claim to be to confuse Abernathy and save Can't-Get-Right.

During a dance social, Biscuit confides to Ray that he is due for release but fears returning to his family because of his homosexuality. Despite Ray’s sincere encouragement to resume life on the outside, Biscuit instead commits suicide by crossing the gun line, much to the shock and heartache of the other inmates. Can't-Get-Right's release without Ray and Claude causes extreme frustration and a bitter falling out. Over the following years, Ray attempts several escapes alone unsuccessfully.

By 1972, Ray and Claude are still not speaking; their friends have all died except for Willie. One day, Claude snaps, running past armed guards to steal a pie, and he is punished by having to stand barefoot on a case of bottles for 24 hours. Dillard offers to set Ray free if he will shoot Claude should he move. Ray refuses and is given the same punishment. Touched, Claude apologizes, and they finally make amends.

One day, Ray and Claude are transferred to live and work at Superintendent Dexter Wilkins' mansion. Ray does yard work, while Claude works inside and befriends with him. Claude is entrusted to pick up the new superintendent, Sheriff Warren Pike, the man who wrongfully framed them. While on a pheasant hunt, Ray notices that Pike has his father's watch, having framed them for killing Winston Hancock 40 years prior. When Ray presses Pike on the true origins of his watch, Pike instantly recognizes Ray and threatens to shoot him. Ray wrestles the gun and points it at Pike. He tells Wilkins that Pike framed him and Claude for murder, which the sheriff admits without remorse by justifying that at least the state of Mississippi had them as cheap labor for 40 years. As Claude struggles to stop Ray from killing him, Pike aims at them both with a hidden Derringer. Realizing that they are both innocent, Wilkins kills Pike and covers it up as a hunting accident, but then suffers a fatal heart attack in his bathroom before he can pardon them.

In 1997, present day, Ray and Claude live in the prison infirmary. Claude tells Ray a new plan, but Ray has accepted his fate. Later that night, the infirmary catches fire, and they seemingly perish in the flames. Willie concludes the tale by outlining Claude's plan: Ray and Claude would steal two bodies from the morgue, start the blaze, plant the bodies, hide and escape in the fire trucks. Willie reveals to the workers and inmates the plan worked: the bodies buried are not Ray and Claude, who have gone back to New York immediately and are watching a Yankees game. They are again on good terms, free and living together in Harlem.

Cast

Production
In July 1996, it was announced Eddie Murphy would star in the buddy comedy Life. The film was the result of a pitch Murphy gave to Brian Grazer, whom Murphy previously worked with on The Nutty Professor. The film was the first of a two-movie deal between Murphy and Imagine Entertainment, the second being Bowfinger. 

Although Life is set in Parchman, Mississippi, it was filmed in California. Filming locations in the Los Angeles area included Downey and Norwalk, in addition to the Universal Pictures backlot. Locations in northern California included Sacramento, Brentwood, and Locke. Filming took place from March to June of 1998.

Reception

Box office
Life was released on April 16, 1999 in North America. On its opening weekend, the film grossed $20,414,775, making it the biggest April opening at that time. However, its gross the next weekend amounted to $11,257,995, and $6,481,175 in its third weekend. Its domestic run concluded with $63,886,029 for a worldwide total of $73,475,268, making it a financial disappointment.

Critical response
On Rotten Tomatoes, it has an approval rating of 51% based on 57 reviews, with an average rating of 5.7/10. The site's critic consensus reads, "Entertaining if not over-the-top humor from a solid comic duo provides plenty of laughs." On Metacritic, it has a weighted average score of 63 out of 100, indicating "generally favorable reviews". Audiences surveyed by CinemaScore gave the film an average grade of "B+" on an A+ to F scale.

Janet Maslin of The New York Times gave a positive review, writing "Lawrence and Murphy make an entertaining team", and noting "Murphy in particular develops a more substantial personality than might be expected here. As he evolves affectingly from a fast-talking hotshot into an old man with the growl and gait of a venerable blues singer, he seems to be reaching for a greater acting opportunity than this lightweight material can offer. It's a performance that feels solid even when the film is at its most formulaic, or when it vacillates strangely."

Since its release, the film has gained a strong cult following, with Elliot Smith of Entertainment Weekly classifying it as one of Murphy’s best: A surprisingly touching buddy comedy-drama that both lives up to and subverts audience expectations, Life has become a cult classic over the past 20-plus years, showing the artistic range of stars Murphy and Martin Lawrence. The film is greatly aided by the steady hand of director Ted Demme, who gives his actors both freedom to shine while also reining in their overwrought impulses.

Accolades
 Academy Awards
 nominated, Rick Baker for Best Makeup (1999)
 NAACP Image Award
 nominated for Outstanding Motion Picture (2000)
 BMI Film & TV Awards
 (won) for Most Performed Song from a Film (2000)
 Blockbuster Entertainment Awards
 nominated with Eddie Murphy for Favorite Comedy Team (2000) for the movie
 nominated for Favorite Song from a Movie (Fortunate)

Soundtrack

A soundtrack containing hip hop and R&B music was released on March 16, 1999 on Rock Land/Interscope Records. It peaked at 10 on the Billboard 200 and 2 on the Top R&B/Hip-Hop Albums and was certified platinum with over 1 million copies sold on June 18, 1999.

References

External links
 
 

1999 films
1999 comedy-drama films
1990s crime comedy-drama films
1990s buddy comedy-drama films
1990s prison films
African-American comedy-drama films
American crime comedy-drama films
American buddy comedy-drama films
American prison comedy films
American prison drama films
1990s English-language films
Films about miscarriage of justice
Films produced by Brian Grazer
Films directed by Ted Demme
Films set in Mississippi
Films set in New York City
Films set in prison
Films set in the 1930s
Films set in the 1940s
Films set in the 1970s
Imagine Entertainment films
Films about prison escapes
Universal Pictures films
Films about racism in the United States
Films about old age
Films set in 1972
Films set in 1997
Films set in 1944
Films set in 1932
1990s American films